Jon Rushby is a comic artist best known for drawing Team Toxic for the Toxic! comic. He also drew Come to Beanotown for The Beano and Growing Paynes for The Dandy. He also drew for the first three issues of the British version of the Earthworm Jim comic.

References

Year of birth missing (living people)
Living people
British comics artists
The Dandy people
The Beano people